Abednico Powell (born 28 January 1983) is a Botswana footballer who currently plays for Mogoditshane Fighters.

Career
Powell began his professional career in 2006 with ECCO City Green and signed in summer 2007 with Extension Gunners. He left in January 2010 to go to the League rival Township Rollers. left Township Rollers and signed with Mogoditshane Fighters.

International
He has won one cap for the Botswana national football team.

Notes

1983 births
Living people
People from Gaborone
Botswana footballers
Extension Gunners FC players
Botswana international footballers
Township Rollers F.C. players
Mogoditshane Fighters players
ECCO City Green players
2012 Africa Cup of Nations players
Association football midfielders